= Empire of Constantinople =

Empire of Constantinople may refer to:

- Byzantine Empire (395–1204, 1261–1453)
- Latin Empire (1204–1261)
